The Ludwig Maximilian University of Munich (simply University of Munich or LMU) is a public research university in Munich, Germany. Originally established in Ingolstadt in 1472 by Duke Ludwig IX of Bavaria-Landshut, it is Germany's sixth-oldest university in continuous operation.

In 1800, the university was moved from Ingolstadt to Landshut by King Maximilian I of Bavaria when the city was threatened by the French, before being relocated to its present-day location in Munich in 1826 by King Ludwig I of Bavaria. In 1802, the university was officially named Ludwig-Maximilians-Universität by King Maximilian I of Bavaria in honor of himself and Ludwig IX.

LMU is currently the second-largest university in Germany in terms of student population; in the 2018/19 winter semester, the university had a total of 51,606 matriculated students. Of these, 9,424 were freshmen while international students totalled 8,875 or approximately 17% of the student population. As for operating budget, the university records in 2018 a total of 734,9 million euros in funding without the university hospital; with the university hospital, the university has a total funding amounting to approximately 1.94 billion euros.

As of 2020, the University of Munich is associated with 43 Nobel laureates. Among these were Wilhelm Röntgen, Max Planck, Werner Heisenberg, Otto Hahn and Thomas Mann. 
Notable alumni, faculty and researchers include Pope Benedict XVI, Rudolf Peierls, Josef Mengele, Richard Strauss, Walter Benjamin, Joseph Campbell, Muhammad Iqbal, Marie Stopes, Wolfgang Pauli, Bertolt Brecht, Max Horkheimer, Karl Loewenstein, Carl Schmitt, Gustav Radbruch, Ernst Cassirer, Ernst Bloch and Konrad Adenauer. LMU has recently been conferred the title of "University of Excellence" under the German Universities Excellence Initiative, and is a member of U15 as well as the LERU. In university rankings, the university is consistently placed among the best universities in Germany.

History

1472–1800 

The university was founded with papal approval in 1472 as the University of Ingolstadt (foundation right of Louis IX the Rich), with faculties of philosophy, medicine, jurisprudence and theology. Its first rector was Christopher Mendel of Steinfels, who later became bishop of Chiemsee.

In the period of German humanism, the university's academics included names such as Conrad Celtes and Petrus Apianus. The theologian Johann Eck also taught at the university. From 1549 to 1773, the university was influenced by the Jesuits and became one of the centres of the Counter-Reformation. The Jesuit Petrus Canisius served as rector of the university.

At the end of the 18th century, the university was influenced by the Enlightenment, which led to a stronger emphasis on natural science.

1800–1933 

In 1800, the Prince-Elector Maximilian IV Joseph (the later Maximilian I, King of Bavaria) moved the university to Landshut, due to French aggression that threatened Ingolstadt during the Napoleonic Wars. In 1802, the university was renamed the Ludwig Maximilian University in honour of its two founders, Louis IX, Duke of Bavaria and Maximilian I, Elector of Bavaria. The Minister of Education, Maximilian von Montgelas, initiated a number of reforms that sought to modernize the rather conservative and Jesuit-influenced university. In 1826, it was moved to Munich, the capital of the Kingdom of Bavaria. The university was situated in the Old Academy until a new building in the Ludwigstraße was completed. The locals were somewhat critical of the number of Protestant professors Maximilian and later Ludwig I invited to Munich. They were dubbed the "Nordlichter" (northern lights) and especially physician Johann Nepomuk von Ringseis was quite angry about them.

In the second half of the 19th century, the university rose to great prominence in the European scientific community, attracting many of the world's leading scientists. It was also a period of great expansion. From 1903, women were allowed to study at Bavarian universities, and by 1918, the female proportion of students at LMU had reached 18%. In 1918, Adele Hartmann became the first woman in Germany to earn the Habilitation (higher doctorate), at LMU.

During the Weimar Republic, the university continued to be one of the world's leading universities, with professors such as Wilhelm Röntgen, Wilhelm Wien, Richard Willstätter, Arnold Sommerfeld and Ferdinand Sauerbruch.

1933–1945 

During the Third Reich, academic freedom was severely curtailed. In 1943 the White Rose group of anti-Nazi students conducted their campaign of opposition to the National Socialists at this university. The university stripped the Nazi-opposition fighter Kurt Huber of his position and his doctorate at the time of his arrest.

1945–present 

 

The university has continued to be one of the leading universities of West Germany during the Cold War and in the post-reunification era. In the late 1960s, the university was the scene of protests by radical students.

Today, the University of Munich is part of 24 Collaborative Research Centers funded by the German Research Foundation (DFG) and is host university of 13 of them. It also hosts 12 DFG Research Training Groups and three international doctorate programs as part of the Elite Network of Bavaria, an educational policy concept of Bavaria for the promotion of gifted pupils and students in the higher education sector. It attracts an additional 120 million euros per year in outside funding and is intensively involved in national and international funding initiatives.

LMU Munich has a wide range of degree programs, with 150 subjects available in numerous combinations. 15% of the 45,000 students who attend the university come from abroad.

In 2005, Germany's state and federal governments launched the German Universities Excellence Initiative, a contest among its universities. With a total of 1.9 billion euros, 75 percent of which comes from the federal state, its architects aim to strategically promote top-level research and scholarship. The money is given to more than 30 research universities in Germany.

The initiative will fund three project-oriented areas: graduate schools to promote the next generation of scholars, clusters of excellence to promote cutting-edge research and "future concepts" for the project-based expansion of academic excellence at universities as a whole. In order to qualify for this third area, a university had to have at least one internationally recognized academic center of excellence and a new graduate school.

After the first round of selections, LMU Munich was invited to submit applications for all three funding lines: It entered the competition with proposals for two graduate schools and four clusters of excellence.

On Friday 13 October 2006, a blue-ribbon panel announced the results of the Germany-wide Excellence Initiative for promoting top university research and education. The panel, composed of the German Research Foundation and the German Science Council, has decided that LMU Munich will receive funding for all three areas covered by the Initiative: one graduate school, three "excellence clusters" and general funding for the university's "future concept".

In January 2012, scientists at the Ludwig Maximilian University published details of the most sensitive listening device known so far. This has led to the college being inducted into the Guinness book of world records.

In September 2018, the Munich public prosecutor's office investigated against a vice president of the university on suspicion of unfaithfulness. The vice president should have claimed "excessive travel expenses". In the following year, veterinary students reported that the LMU violated animal welfare. According to them, the LMU keeps pigs in tight grid boxes, so that some animals showed scratches, bumps and respiratory diseases from lying down. Students who report these circumstances told that they been threatened with the deregistration of the university. In the beginning of 2020, the LMU locked around 80 students in a room who wanted to discuss under the topic "Climate Burns, University Burns" why universities are doing research for companies that are harmful to the climate.

Campus 

LMU's institutes and research centers are spread throughout Munich, with several buildings located in the suburbs of Oberschleissheim and Garching as well as Maisach and Bad Tölz. The university's main buildings are grouped around Geschwister-Scholl-Platz and Professor-Huber-Platz on Ludwigstrasse, extending into side streets such as Akademiestraße, Schellingstraße, and Veterinärstraße. Other large campuses and institutes are located in Großhadern (Klinikum Großhadern), Martinsried (chemistry and biotechnology campus), the Ludwigsvorstadt (Klinikum Innenstadt) and in the Lehel (Institut am Englischen Garten), across from the main buildings, through the Englischer Garten.

The university's main building is situated in Geschwister-Scholl-Platz and the university's main campus is served by the Munich subway's Universität station.

Great Assembly Hall (Große Aula) 

The große Aula is located in the university main building at Ludwigstraße in Munich. The Aula was constructed as part of the main building by Friedrich von Gärtner and completed in 1840. The hall is situated in the first floor and extends to the second floor.

The Aula was not destroyed during World War II and, thus, is one of few usable pre war venues in Munich. The Aula was used for the first performances of concerts after the war. Furthermore, it was venue for the constituent assembly of the state of Bavaria, where the current Bavarian constitution was enacted.

Today, the Aula hosts mainly concerts, talks and lectures.

Academics

Fields of study 
Despite the Bologna Process which saw the demise of most traditional academic-degree courses such as the Diplom and Magister Artium in favour of the more internationally known Bachelors and Masters system, the University of Munich continues to offer more than 100 areas of study with numerous combinations of majors and minors.

In line with the university's internationalisation as a popular destination for tertiary studies, an increasing number of courses mainly at the graduate and post-graduate levels are also available in English to cater to international students who may have little or no background in the German language. Some notable subject areas which currently offer programmes in English include various fields of psychology, physics as well as business and management.

Faculties 

The university consists of 18 faculties which oversee various departments and institutes. The official numbering of the faculties and the missing numbers 06 and 14 are the result of breakups and mergers of faculties in the past. The Faculty of Forestry Operations with number 06 has been integrated into the Technical University of Munich in 1999 and faculty number 14 has been merged with faculty number 13.
 01 Faculty of Catholic Theology
 02 Faculty of Protestant Theology
 03 Faculty of Law
 04 Faculty of Business Administration
 05 Faculty of Economics
 07 Faculty of Medicine
 08 Faculty of Veterinary Medicine
 09 Faculty for History and the Arts
 10 Faculty of Philosophy, Philosophy of Science and Study of Religion
 11 Faculty of Psychology and Educational Sciences
 12 Faculty for the Study of Culture
 13 Faculty for Languages and Literatures
 15 Faculty of Social Sciences
 16 Faculty of Mathematics, Computer Science and Statistics
 17 Faculty of Physics
 18 Faculty of Chemistry and Pharmacy
 19 Faculty of Biology
 20 Faculty of Geosciences and Environmental Sciences

Research centres 

In addition to its 18 faculties, the University of Munich also maintains numerous research centres involved in numerous cross-faculty and transdisciplinary projects to complement its various academic programmes. Some of these research centres were a result of cooperation between the university and renowned external partners from academia and industry; the Rachel Carson Center for Environment and Society, for example, was established through a joint initiative between LMU Munich and the Deutsches Museum, while the Parmenides Center for the Study of Thinking resulted from the collaboration between the Parmenides Foundation and LMU Munich's Human Science Center.

Some of the research centres which have been established include:
 Center for Integrated Protein Science Munich (CIPSM)
 Graduate School of Systemic Neurosciences (GSN)
 Helmholtz Zentrum München – German Research Center for Environmental Health
 Nanosystems Initiative Munich (NIM)
 Parmenides Center for the Study of Thinking
 Rachel Carson Center for Environment and Society

Tuition and fees 

Universities in Bavaria do not charge tuition fees. Instead, a semester fee and a mandatory off-hours public transportation semester ticket (for the Munich Transport and Tariff Association, MVV) have to be paid. A full network pass is optionally available. This mixed model is the result of several years of negotiations to allow students to get an affordable semester ticket despite the high costs of regular tickets in Munich. The current package was accepted by an overwhelming majority of 86.3% of students across all Munich universities in 2012 and introduced in the 2013 winter term.

Rankings 

LMU Munich is ranked as follows:
The Times Higher Education Ranking 2023 ranks LMU Munich 2nd in Germany, and 33rd in the world.
 In 2023, QS World University Rankings ranks LMU Munich 59th overall in the world and 2nd in Germany.
 The Shanghai Jiao Tong University's Academic Ranking of World Universities ranks LMU Munich 2nd nationally and 57th in the world as of 2022
 The Best Global Universities Ranking of the U.S. News & World Report ranks LMU Munich 1st nationally and 47th in the world as of 2022
 In November 2018 Expertscape recognized it as one of the top ten institutions in the world in pancreatic cancer
In 2018 and 2019, the LMU took 1st place based on the number of DAX board of management members. The top 3 universities in 2019 were the LMU Munich, the RWTH Aachen and the Technische Universität Darmstadt.
According to the funding report of the German Research Foundation (DFG) of 2021, which breaks down the grants from 2017 to 2019, LMU Munich ranked 1st among German universities. By area, it ranked 1st in the life sciences, 2nd in the humanities and social sciences, and 6th in the natural sciences.

One Munich Strategy Forum 

The LMU and the Technical University of Munich have come together to work on "One Munich Strategy Forum", with a €2.5 million fund from the state of Bavaria.

Munich International Summer University (MISU at LMU Munich) 
The Munich International Summer University (MISU at LMU) is the Summer University by the Ludwig Maximilian University of Munich (LMU), which takes place annually in Munich and depending on the course also involves stays at different European cities. MISU at LMU Munich invites international students to attend short-term programs at the LMU Munich in order to progress academically even in winter or summer breaks at their home university. MISU hereby offers two course formats: On the one hand German Language classes are held at different times over the year. On the other hand, MISU offers 16 subject-specific Summer Schools and Winter Schools covering a wide range of academic fields. Around 1000 students from nearly 90 countries joined MISU short-term programs in 2019.

History 
Germany has a long tradition of hosting summer programs for international students. The LMU Munich organised its Summer University for the first time in 1927. Labelled as Sommerkurse für Ausländer (Summer Courses for Foreigners) the Summer University ran annually until 1934 and primarily consisted of German Language courses for international students. After a longer intermittence period, LMU's Summer University resumed as Internationaler Münchner Sommer (International Summer in Munich). Since then the number of courses has increased and the range of subject-specific Summer Schools was extended to further academic disciplines. From 2008 onwards LMU's Summer University operates under the name Munich International Summer University (MISU).

Objectives 
A central aim of MISU is to boost the interntationality of the LMU Munich in terms of research and teaching. Compared to semester-based student exchange programs, short-term programs such as Summer Schools have the advantage for international students to receive a very intensive and concise insight into the research areas and campus at the LMU Munich. MISU hereby has the objective to combine excellent academic education with extra-curricular activities. Participants are thus not only supervised intensively by established researchers on selected topics but are also introduced to the history, culture and politics of Munich, Bavaria and Germany. Moreover, the Summer University allows the LMU Munich to intensify cooperation with international partner universities. MISU's short-term programs therefore strengthen the LMU's international visibility as one of the highest ranked universities in Europe. Having attended MISU courses, students might consider pursuing a postgraduate study or a doctoral degree at the LMU Munich in the future. Participants who fulfilled all course requirements are awarded with graded certificates and ECTS credits in line with the European Credit Transfer System.

Courses 
MISU offers two course formats: subject-specific summer academies and German Language Classes.
MISU's summer academies are subject-specific courses that either introduce students to new topics or upgrade students' knowledge on research areas in academic fields of interest. The summer academies are designed and organized in close cooperation with LMU's faculties and researchers. Most of the summer academies are open for students of different academic backgrounds and levels. Interdisciplinary seminars bring the advantage that students may exchange information beyond their respective academic fields and may hence learn from each other about new perspectives. The number of participants per course is limited in order to ensure intensive supervision and student interactions in class. Most of the summer academies do not only take place in Munich but also provide for academic and culturally motivated stays in other European cities. The following academic disciplines are covered by MISU summer academies.
 Economics, Business and Communication (Electronic media, Management accounting, Analytics)
 Social Sciences (European studies, Middle Eastern studies)
 Law (Law of Germany, European Union Law, International law)
 Medicine (Oncology, Neurology, Medical research)
 Natural Sciences (Quantum Optics, Neuroscience)

MISU's German Language Courses are open for students all over the world. Courses are geared towards the aim to teach the German language in its academic, social and cultural context in order to ensure that students advance their language skills while also improving their knowledge on Germany. Therefore, MISU offers Language courses for all levels – basic, intermediate and advanced – at different times of the year. The Federal Republic of Germany offers scholarships for these purposes through the Deutsche Akademische Austauschdienst (DAAD).
 Summer German Language Courses
 Study Preparation Courses
 Specialized Courses for Advanced Learners

Notable alumni and faculty members 

The alumni of Ludwig Maximilian University of Munich played a major role in the development of quantum mechanics. Max Planck, the founder of quantum theory and Nobel laureate in Physics in 1918, was an alumnus of the university. Founders of quantum mechanics such as Werner Heisenberg, Wolfgang Pauli, and others were associated with the university.
Most recently, to honor the Nobel laureate in Chemistry Gerhard Ertl, who worked as a professor at the University of Munich from 1973 to 1986, the building of the Physical Chemistry was named after him.

Pakistani philosopher and poet Sir Muhammad Iqbal, regarded as the "Poet of the East" and "The Thinker of Pakistan", earned his PhD degree from the Ludwig Maximilian University, Munich in 1908. Working under the guidance of Friedrich Hommel, Iqbal published his doctoral thesis in 1908, entitled The Development of Metaphysics in Persia.

The anti-Nazi resistance White Rose was based in this university.

See also 
 Education in Germany
 List of forestry universities and colleges
 List of modern universities in Europe (1801–1945)
 List of universities in Germany

Notes

References

External links 

360° Panorama at the Ludwig Maximilian University
Munich International Summer University (MISU at LMU Munich)

 

 
Universities and colleges in Munich
Munich
Educational institutions established in 1826
1826 establishments in Bavaria
Tourist attractions in Munich
Historicist architecture in Munich
Universities established in the 19th century